In enzymology, a flavonol synthase is an enzyme that catalyzes the  following chemical reaction :

dihydroflavonol + 2-oxoglutarate +   a flavonol + succinate + C + H2O

The 3 substrates of this enzyme are dihydroflavonol, 2-oxoglutarate, and O2, whereas its 4 products are flavonol, succinate, CO2, and H2O.

The systematic name of this enzyme class is dihydroflavonol,2-oxoglutarate:oxygen oxidoreductase. This enzyme participates in flavonoid biosynthesis.

References 

 
 
 
 

EC 1.14.11
Enzymes of unknown structure
Flavonols metabolism